Miwon Kwon (born November 18, 1961) is a Korean curator and art history educator. Her work focuses on contemporary art, land art and site-specific art.  She has curated several exhibitions at the Whitney Museum of American Art, and most recently she co-curated the exhibition Ends of the Earth: Land Art to 1974 at the Museum of Contemporary Art, Los Angeles with Philipp Kaiser.  She began her position in the Art History Department at UCLA in 1998, where she currently maintains her tenure as the department chair.

Early life and education
Kwon was born in South Korea in 1961, and at age ten migrated to the United States, where her father was employed as a foreign correspondent for a Korean newspaper. She graduated from UC Berkeley with a B.A. in Architecture and a M.A. in Photography, and then went on to Princeton University to complete a Ph.D. in Architectural History and Theory in 1998.

Published works
She was a founding editor and publisher of the art criticism publication Documents and has contributed essays to a number of arts publications, exhibition catalogs and art monographs. She is the author of One Place After Another: Site Specific Art and Locational Identity, published by MIT Press in 2002. Her work has received critical review Stephen Morton, who praised the book for being "an exciting survey of the genealogies and practices that variously constitute site-specificity" but criticizing it for not addressing "its own site-specificity in the US metropolitan art world". Kwon also contributed an essay entitled "Sitings of Public Art: Integration versus Intervention" to the 2002 anthology Alternative Art New York, 1965-1985. She is currently working on her next book, a comprehensive study on the Cuban conceptual artist Felix Gonzalez-Torres. In 2012, Kwon organized the exhibition Ends of the Earth: Land Art to 1974 at MOCA with Philipp Kaiser, and edited an extensive catalogue of the same name, published by Prestel.

References

1961 births
Living people
American art curators
American women curators
South Korean curators
South Korean women curators
American art historians
American people of Korean descent
University of California, Berkeley alumni
Princeton University alumni
University of California, Los Angeles faculty
Women art historians
UC Berkeley College of Environmental Design alumni
American women historians
South Korean women historians
Historians from California
21st-century American women